Alūksne Upland (Alūksne Highland, Latvian: Alūksnes augstiene) is a hilly area of higher elevation in eastern Latvia, in the historical region of Vidzeme. Sometimes it is referred to as the East Vidzeme Upland, to distinguish it from another hilly area of Vidzeme, Vidzeme Upland, also known as the "Central Vidzeme Upland".

Geography
The upland continues into the neighboring Estonia as the Haanja Upland.

The Alūksne Upland is part of the drainage divide between Gauja and Daugava river basins.

References

Hills of Latvia
Plateaus of Latvia